Roy Reid Leslie (August 23, 1894 – April 9, 1972) was a Major League Baseball first baseman.

Leslie's minor league baseball career spanned seventeen seasons.

Notes

Sources

Major League Baseball first basemen
Chicago Cubs players
St. Louis Cardinals players
Philadelphia Phillies players
Bonham Blues players
Ennis Tigers players
Ardmore Indians players
Paris Survivors players
Fort Worth Panthers players
Waco Navigators players
Houston Buffaloes players
New Orleans Pelicans (baseball) players
Salt Lake City Bees players
Hollywood Stars players
San Antonio Bears players
Mexia Gushers players
Tyler Trojans players
Minor league baseball managers
Baseball players from Texas
1894 births
1972 deaths